Pegadapalli or Pegadapalle is a village in Jaipur Mandal in Mancherial District of  the Indian state of Telangana. It belongs to the Telangana region.

Demographics 
 census, Pegadapalle had a population of 1,359. The total population constitute, 663 males and 696 females —a sex ratio of 1,050 females per 1000 males. 137 children are in the age group of 0–6 years. The average literacy rate stands at 60.56% with 740 literates.

Power station
Pegadapalli (Adilabad or Jaipur) power station is an 1,800-megawatt (MW) coal-fired power plant under development in Telangana.

References 

Villages in Mancherial district